Señoráns is a village in the province of A Coruña, Galicia, Spain. 
Señoráns is a village in the parish of Salto in the municipalities Vimianzo in the comarca of Terra de Soneira. It had 86 habitantes (INE 2009).
The comarca is located in northwest Spain. It borders three other comarcas: Cabana de Bergantiños to the north; Santiago de Compostela to the south and east; and Camariñas to the west.

Terra de Soneira is a comarca in the province of A Coruña, Galicia, Spain. The population of this local region was 20,886 (INE 2005).

References 

 Mapa de Señoráns (Provincia de A Coruña - Galicia)
 Señoráns, Vimianzo, A Coruña - Foto Pueblos

Populated places in the Province of A Coruña